Ashraqat is an Arabic feminine name meaning "dawned." It came into use in Egypt as a popular name for newborn girls because of a character on a soap opera that aired there in the late 1990s.

Notes

Arabic feminine given names